Kalavashk or Kalaveshk may refer to:
 Kalavashk, Rud Ab
 Kalavashk, Sheshtomad